Teddy Channel (Hebrew: "ערוץ טדי" or "טדי - קטעים פה") is an Israeli Television Channel is owned by Teddy entrepreneurship and productions Ltd. Its Broadcasts on Partner TV in channel 15 since November 2017 until December 30, 2021.

The channel is led by Yuval Natan. The main content manager of the channel is the editor and scriptwriter Nadav Frishman, and the main producer is Asaf Gordon.

Launch 
In June 2017 Partner TV increased its service. With the announcement of the launch of the service, it was also announced that Partner is working with Teddy Productions on a new television channel that will broadcast stand-up and entertainment shows. 
At the end of October 2017, Partner organized a press conference announcing the launching of a new channel called Teddy. During the press conference it was announced that the channel would share ownership of the content with its 50/50 creators.

Channel broadcasts 
The channel broadcasts 24 hours a day; however the number of the initial broadcast hours every day is small (true for 2017), but the assessment is that this number will grow in the future.

This is the only who broadcasts exclusive content in Partner TV, and you can take note of the importance of the channel in its location on the remote control - channel 15, immediately after the big commercial channels.

The channel is built on the concept of Bite Size TV and its programs available on Partner TV's VOD and the Catch Up service, which enables view of broadcasts up to two weeks ago.

Programs 
 Shemesh
 Ha-Comedy Store
 HaShir Shelanu
 Sachiland
 Tovim and Tovim Pachot
 Super Feed
 Stoppers and errands
 Israeli gentlemens
 Storiz
 Personal studio
 Star Network
 Eve Sherman Properties
 Trio Artistic truth

See also 
 Keshet 12
 Reshet 13
 Channel Ten

References 

Television channels in Israel
Television channels and stations established in 2017
Television channels and stations disestablished in 2021
Comedy television networks
Defunct television channels in Israel